The World's Best American Band is the second studio album by Kentuckian band White Reaper. The album was released through Polyvinyl on April 7, 2017.

Release and promotion

Three songs were released as singles in promotion of the album.

Singles
White Reaper announced their first single, "Judy French," through Stereogum on January 26, 2017, about a month and a half prior to the release of the album. Critics immediately noticed a more power pop-infused sound classic rock tone to the band's sound from their previous garage and lo-fi sound that dominated their previous works. Ben Kaye of Consequence of Sound, described the single as a "frills-free slice of power pop, strutting not only with confidence but unbridled glee."

Approximately a month later, the band released their second single, the title track, on February 27, 2017, through Stereogum. Stereogum beat writer James Rettig described the second single as "an energetic and dense rocker that serves as a good follow-up to lead single 'Judy French'".

In March 2017, the band released their third single, "The Stack". Pranav Trewn of Stereogum described the third track as "another fireball of Southern swagger and jingly garage-rock momentum."

Track listing

Charts

References

World's Best American Band, the
World's Best American Band, the
World's Best American Band, the